This is a list of rivers in the U.S. state of West Virginia.

List of West Virginia rivers includes streams formally designated as rivers.  There are also smaller streams (i.e., branches, creeks, drains, forks, licks, runs, etc.) in the state.  Exclusive of major tributaries, there are about 46 named rivers in West Virginia.  Though relatively few in number, rivers have traditionally provided easy avenues of transportation through the rough terrain of the Mountain State, first by Native Americans and later by European settlers.  Even today, the larger rivers transport large volumes of commercial goods, while the smaller ones provide recreational opportunities such as canoeing, fishing, swimming, and white-water rafting.

By tributary

Ohio River
Monongahela River
Tygart Valley River
Leading Creek
Middle Fork River
Buckhannon River
Left Fork Buckhannon River
Right Fork Buckhannon River
French Creek
Sandy Creek
Three Fork Creek
West Fork River
Stonecoal Creek
Kincheloe Creek
Hackers Creek
Elk Creek
Simpson Creek
Ann Run stream
Tenmile Creek
Little Tenmile Creek
Bingamon Creek
Booths Creek
Buffalo Creek
Pyles Fork
Paw Paw Creek
Panther Lick Run
Deckers Creek
Cheat River
Shavers Fork
Black Fork
Dry Fork
Gandy Creek
Red Creek
Laurel Fork
Glady Fork
Otter Creek
Blackwater River
Little Blackwater River
Beaver Creek
North Fork Blackwater River
Horseshoe Run
Saltlick Creek
Muddy Creek
Big Sandy Creek
Little Sandy Creek (Big Sandy Creek tributary), in Pennsylvania and West Virginia
Little Sandy Creek (West Virginia)
Dunkard Creek
Youghiogheny River
Muchmores Run
Tomlinson Run
Whiteoak Run
North Fork Tomlinson Run
Mercer Run
South Fork Tomlinson Run
Deep Gut Run
Hardin Run
Langfitt Run
Holbert Run
Kings Creek
Turkeyfoot Run
North Fork Kings Creek
Lawrence Run
Lick Run
Harmon Creek
Sappingtons Run
Alexanders Run
Mechling Run
Cross Creek
Bosley Run
Ebenezer Run
North Potrock Run
Potrock Run
Scott Run
Parmar Run
Buffalo Creek
Painters Run
Greens Run
Titt Run
Pierce Run
Kimlin Run
Grog Run
Mingo Run
Hukill Run
Hogtan Run
Stotts Run
Logan Run
Castleman Run
Longs Run
Cascade Run
Camp Run
Sugarcamp Run
Short Creek
Girty Run
Newlands Run
Waddles Run
North Fork Short Creek
Glenns Run
Wheeling Creek
Long Run
Enlow Fork
Dunkard Fork
Little Wheeling Creek
Boggs Run
Grave Creek
Fish Creek
Pennsylvania Fork Fish Creek
West Virginia Fork Fish Creek
Long Drain
Harker Run
Fishing Creek
North Fork Fishing Creek
South Fork Fishing Creek
Arches Fork
Piney Fork
Little Fishing Creek
Middle Island Creek
Buckeye Creek
Meathouse Fork
Indian Fork
Toms Fork
Arnold Creek
McElroy Creek
Flint Run
Indian Creek
Point Pleasant Creek
Elk Fork
Sancho Creek
Sugar Creek
Bills Creek
McKim Creek
Little Kanawha River
Right Fork Little Kanawha River
Saltlick Creek
Sand Fork
Leading Creek
Fink Creek
Cove Creek
Cedar Creek
Steer Creek
Left Fork Steer Creek
Right Fork Steer Creek
West Fork Little Kanawha River
Henry Fork
Spring Creek
Reedy Creek
Hughes River
North Fork Hughes River
Bonds Creek
South Fork Hughes River
Middle Fork
Spruce Creek
Indian Creek (South Fork Hughes River tributary)
Slate Creek
Walker Creek
Tygart Creek
Worthington Creek
Lee Creek
Pond Creek
Sandy Creek
Left Fork Sandy Creek
Right Fork Sandy Creek
Mill Creek
Little Mill Creek
Frozencamp Creek
Elk Fork
Tug Fork (Mill Creek tributary)
Kanawha River
New River
East River
Indian Creek
Bluestone River
Little Bluestone River
Brush Creek
Greenbrier River
East Fork Greenbrier River
Little River (East Fork Greenbrier River tributary)
West Fork Greenbrier River
Little River (West Fork Greenbrier River tributary)
Leatherbark Run
Deer Creek
Sitlington Creek
Knapp Creek
Spring Creek
Anthony Creek
Howard Creek
Second Creek
Muddy Creek
Glade Creek
Piney Creek
Beaver Creek
Crab Orchard Creek
Bonnett's Run
Gauley River
Williams River
Cranberry River
North Fork Cranberry River
South Fork Cranberry River
Cherry River
North Fork Cherry River
South Fork Cherry River
Laurel Creek
Big Beaver Creek
Muddlety Creek
Hominy Creek
Meadow River
Big Clear Creek
Anglins Creek
Twentymile Creek
Loop Creek
Armstrong Creek
Smithers Creek
Paint Creek
Kellys Creek
Cabin Creek
Witcher Creek
Lens Creek
Campbells Creek
Elk River
Baltimore Run
Back Fork Elk River
Sugar Creek
Laurel Creek
Holly River
Left Fork Holly River
Right Fork Holly River
Desert Fork
Grassy Creek
Birch River
Little Birch River
Buffalo Creek
Big Sandy Creek
Blue Creek
Little Sandy Creek
Twomile Creek
Davis Creek
Coal River
Big Coal River
Clear Fork
Marsh Fork
Laurel Creek
Little Coal River
Spruce Fork
Spruce Laurel Fork
Pond Fork
Pocatalico River
Heizer Creek
Hurricane Creek
Eighteenmile Creek (Kanawha River tributary)
Thirteenmile Creek
Sixteenmile Creek
Eighteenmile Creek (Ohio River tributary)
Guyandotte River
Winding Gulf
Slab Fork
Barkers Creek
Pinnacle Creek
Indian Creek
Clear Fork
Laurel Fork
Little Huff Creek
Huff Creek
Buffalo Creek
Island Creek
Copperas Mine Fork
Mud River
Big Creek
Sycamore Creek
Trace Creek
Big Twomile Creek
Trace Fork
Joe's Creek
Hayzlett Fork
Twelvepole Creek
East Fork Twelvepole Creek
West Fork Twelvepole Creek
Beech Fork
Big Sandy River
Tug Fork
Elkhorn Creek
Dry Fork
Panther Creek
Fourpole Creek
Pigeon Creek
Rockhouse Fork

Chesapeake Bay

James River (VA)
Jackson River (VA)
Potts Creek
Cowpasture River (VA)
Bullpasture River
Potomac River
South Branch Potomac River
North Fork South Branch Potomac River
Laurel Fork
Big Run (North Fork South Branch Potomac River tributary)
Mill Creek (North Fork South Branch Potomac River tributary)
Seneca Creek
Lunice Creek
South Fork South Branch Potomac River
Little Fork
Kettle Creek
Mill Run
Mill Creek (South Branch Potomac River tributary)
Big Run (South Branch Potomac River tributary)
Buffalo Creek
North Branch Potomac River
Stony River
Abram Creek
New Creek
Limestone Run
Patterson Creek
Mill Creek (Patterson Creek tributary)
Dans Run
Green Spring Run
Little Cacapon River
North Fork Little Cacapon River
South Fork Little Cacapon River
Cacapon River
Lost River
Trout Run
Capon Springs Run
Mill Branch
Dillons Run
Edwards Run
North River
Grassy Lick Run
Tearcoat Creek
Bearwallow Creek
Sir Johns Run
Warm Spring Run
Sleepy Creek
Meadow Branch
Cherry Run
Back Creek
Tilhance Creek
Opequon Creek
Mill Creek
Middle Creek
Tuscarora Creek
Shenandoah River

Alphabetically
Abram Creek
Alum Creek (Coal River tributary)
Alum Creek (Tug Fork tributary)
Anthony Creek
Armstrong Creek
Arnold Creek
Back Creek
Back Fork Elk River
Baltimore Run
Barkers Creek
Bearwallow Creek
Beaver Creek (Blackwater River tributary)
Beaver Creek (Piney Creek tributary)
Beech Fork
Big Beaver Creek (Gauley River tributary)
Big Clear Creek
Big Coal River
Big Run (North Fork South Branch Potomac River tributary)
Big Run (South Branch Potomac River tributary)
Big Sandy Creek (Cheat River tributary)
Big Sandy Creek (Elk River tributary)
Big Sandy River
Bingamon Creek
Birch River
Black Fork 
Blackwater River
Blue Creek
Bluestone River
Bonds Creek
Bonnett's Run
Booths Creek
Buckeye Creek
Buckhannon River
Buffalo Creek (Elk River tributary, West Virginia)
Buffalo Creek (Guyandotte River tributary)
Buffalo Creek (Monongahela River tributary)
Buffalo Creek (Ohio River tributary)
Buffalo Creek (South Branch Potomac River tributary)
Cabin Creek
Cacapon River
Campbells Creek
Capon Springs Run
Cedar Creek
Cheat River
Cherry River
Cherry Run
Clear Fork (Big Coal River tributary)
Clear Fork (Guyandotte River tributary)
Coal River
Copperas Mine Fork
Cove Creek
Crab Orchard Creek
Cranberry River
Cross Creek
Dans Run
Davis Creek
Deckers Creek
Deer Creek
Desert Fork
Dillons Run
Dry Fork (Cheat River tributary)
Dry Fork (Tug Fork tributary)
Dunkard Creek
Dunkard Fork
East Fork Greenbrier River
East Fork Twelvepole Creek
East River
Edwards Run
Eighteenmile Creek (Kanawha River tributary)
Eighteenmile Creek (Ohio River tributary)
Elk Creek
Elk Fork (Mill Creek tributary)
Elk Fork (Point Pleasant Creek tributary)
Elk River
Elkhorn Creek
Enlow Fork
Fink Creek
Fish Creek
Fishing Creek
Flint Run
Fourpole Creek
French Creek
Frozencamp Creek
Gandy Creek
Gauley River
Glade Creek
Glady Fork
Grassy Creek
Grassy Lick Run
Grave Creek
Green Spring Run
Greenbrier River
Guyandotte River
Hackers Creek
Harker Run
Heizer Creek
Henry Fork
Holly River
Hominy Creek
Horseshoe Run
Howard Creek
Huff Creek
Hughes River
Hurricane Creek
Indian Creek (Guyandotte River tributary)
Indian Creek (Middle Island Creek tributary)
Indian Creek (New River tributary)
Indian Creek (South Fork Hughes River tributary)
Indian Fork
Island Creek
Kanawha River
Kellys Creek
Kettle Creek
Kincheloe Creek
Kings Creek
Knapp Creek
Laurel Creek (Big Coal River tributary)
Laurel Creek (Cherry River tributary)
Laurel Creek (Elk River tributary)
Laurel Fork (Cheat River tributary)
Laurel Fork (Clear Fork Guyandotte River tributary)
Laurel Fork (North Fork South Branch Potomac River tributary)
Leading Creek (Little Kanawha River tributary)
Leading Creek (Tygart Valley River tributary)
Leatherbark Run
Lee Creek
Left Fork Buckhannon River
Left Fork Holly River
Left Fork Sandy Creek
Left Fork Steer Creek
Lens Creek
Limestone Run
Little Birch River
Little Blackwater River
Little Bluestone River
Little Cacapon River
Little Coal River
Little Fishing Creek
Little Fork
Little Huff Creek
Little Kanawha River
Little Mill Creek
Little River (East Fork Greenbrier River tributary)
Little River (West Fork Greenbrier River tributary)
Little Sandy Creek (Big Sandy Creek tributary), in Pennsylvania and West Virginia
Little Sandy Creek (Elk River tributary)
Little Sandy Creek (West Virginia), tributary of Big Sandy Creek entirely in West Virginia
Little Tenmile Creek
Little Wheeling Creek
Long Drain
Loop Creek
Lost River
Lunice Creek
Marsh Fork
McElroy Creek
McKim Creek
Meadow Branch
Meadow River
Meathouse Fork
Middle Creek
Middle Fork (South Fork Hughes River tributary)
Middle Fork River, Tygart Valley River tributary
Middle Island Creek
Mill Branch
Mill Creek (North Fork South Branch Potomac River tributary)
Mill Creek (Opequon Creek tributary)
Mill Creek (Patterson Creek tributary)
Mill Creek (South Branch Potomac River tributary)
Mill Creek (western West Virginia)
Mill Run
Monongahela River
Mud River
Muddlety Creek
Muddy Creek (Cheat River tributary)
Muddy Creek (Greenbrier River tributary)
Negro Run (West Virginia)
New Creek
New River
North Branch Potomac River
North Fork Blackwater River
North Fork Cherry River
North Fork Cranberry River
North Fork Fishing Creek
North Fork Hughes River
North Fork Little Cacapon River
North Fork Short Creek
North Fork South Branch Potomac River
North River
Ohio River
Opequon Creek
Otter Creek
Paint Creek
Panther Creek
Panther Lick Run
Patterson Creek
Paw Paw Creek
Pennsylvania Fork Fish Creek
Pigeon Creek
Piney Creek
Piney Fork
Pinnacle Creek
Pocatalico River
Point Pleasant Creek
Pond Creek
Pond Fork
Potomac River
Potts Creek
Pyles Fork
Red Creek
Reedy Creek
Right Fork Buckhannon River
Right Fork Holly River
Right Fork Little Kanawha River
Right Fork Sandy Creek
Right Fork Steer Creek
Rockhouse Fork
Saltlick Creek (Cheat River tributary)
Saltlick Creek (Little Kanawha River tributary)
Sancho Creek
Sand Fork
Sandy Creek (Ohio River tributary)
Sandy Creek (Tygart Valley River tributary)
Second Creek
Seneca Creek
Shavers Fork
Shenandoah River
Short Creek
Simpson Creek
Sir Johns Run
Sitlington Creek
Sixteenmile Creek
Slab Fork
Sleepy Creek
Smithers Creek
South Branch Potomac River
South Fork Cherry River
South Fork Cranberry River
South Fork Fishing Creek
South Fork Hughes River
South Fork Little Cacapon River
South Fork South Branch Potomac River
Spring Creek (Greenbrier River tributary)
Spring Creek (Little Kanawha River tributary)
Spruce Creek
Spruce Fork
Spruce Laurel Fork
Steer Creek
Stonecoal Creek
Stony River
Sugar Creek (Back Fork Elk River tributary)
Sugar Creek (Middle Island Creek tributary)
Tearcoat Creek
Tenmile Creek
Thirteenmile Creek
Three Fork Creek
Tilhance Creek
Toms Fork
Trace Fork
Trout Run
Tug Fork, tributary of Big Sandy River
Tug Fork (Mill Creek tributary)
Tuscarora Creek
Twelvepole Creek
Twentymile Creek
Twomile Creek
Tygart Creek
Tygart Valley River
Walker Creek
Warm Spring Run
West Fork Greenbrier River
West Fork Little Kanawha River
West Fork River
West Fork Twelvepole Creek
West Virginia Fork Fish Creek
Wheeling Creek
Williams River
Winding Gulf
Witcher Creek
Worthington Creek 
Youghiogheny River
Zebs Creek

See also 

List of rivers in the United States
Teays River
List of islands in West Virginia (with islands in rivers)

External links 

Current stream flow conditions in West Virginia
Bluestone National Scenic River
Friends of the Cheat
New River Gorge National River
West Virginia Rivers Coalition

West Virginia rivers
 
Rivers, List of West Virginia